Timothy Breaux (born September 19, 1970) is an American former professional basketball player.

Born in Baton Rouge, Louisiana, Breaux attended the University of Wyoming and joined the Continental Basketball Association's Sioux Falls Skyforce and also played in Europe, including stints in Spain and France. He signed with the NBA's Houston Rockets in 1994 as an undrafted player. He was traded along with Pete Chilcutt to the Vancouver Grizzlies in 1996 in exchange for some draft picks. He also played briefly with the Milwaukee Bucks.

He last played in 2004 for the CBA's Yakima Sun Kings.

NBA career statistics

Regular season

|-
| align="left" | 1994–95
| align="left" | Houston
| 42 || 2 || 8.1 || .372 || .240 || .653 || 0.8 || 0.4 || 0.3 || 0.1 || 3.0
|-
| align="left" | 1995–96
| align="left" | Houston
| 54 || 4 || 10.6 || .366 || .326 || .622 || 1.1 || 0.4 || 0.2 || 0.1 || 3.0
|-
| align="left" | 1997–98
| align="left" | Milwaukee
| 6 || 0 || 5.0 || .364 || .333 || .500 || 0.3 || 0.3 || 0.3 || 0.2 || 1.7
|- class="sortbottom"
| style="text-align:center;" colspan="2"| Career
| 102 || 6 || 9.2 || .369 || .297 || .635 || 0.9 || 0.4 || 0.2 || 0.1 || 2.9
|}

External links
NBA.com player file

Stats @ clutchfans.net
Tim Breaux photo @ eurobasket.com

1970 births
Living people
African-American basketball players
American expatriate basketball people in Canada
American expatriate basketball people in France
American expatriate basketball people in Germany
American expatriate basketball people in Italy
American expatriate basketball people in Spain
American expatriate basketball people in Turkey
Basketball players from Baton Rouge, Louisiana
Galatasaray S.K. (men's basketball) players
Houston Rockets players
Idaho Stampede (CBA) players
Liga ACB players
Milwaukee Bucks players
Sioux Falls Skyforce (CBA) players
Undrafted National Basketball Association players
Valencia Basket players
Wyoming Cowboys basketball players
Yakima Sun Kings players
American men's basketball players
Forwards (basketball)
American expatriate basketball people in the Philippines
Philippine Basketball Association imports
Shell Turbo Chargers players
21st-century African-American sportspeople
20th-century African-American sportspeople